Wisutthithewi was queen regnant of Lan Na from 1564 to 1578.

Names 
Wisutthithewi's name is variously romanized Visuddhidevi, Wisutthi Thewi, and Wisuthithewi. While the Chiang Mai Chronicle consistently records her name as Wisutthathewi, the Yonok Chronicle prefers Wisutthithewi. She also has a number of names across extant historical sources: in the Burmese and Chiang Saen chronicles, she is referred to as Lady Wisutthathewi, and is also called Maha Dewi (မဟာဒေဝီ) in U Kala's chronicle, Maha Yazawin, and as Ratcha Thewi and Nang Thewi in other sources.

Early life 
Wisutthithewi's origins are unclear; she may have been a daughter of Ket Chettharat, a ruler of Chiang Mai, or Princess Ton Kham, the youngest daughter of Chettharat. She may have been the queen consort of her predecessor Mekuti.

Reign 
The reign of her predecessor, Mekuti, saw Lan Na transition into a vassal state of the Toungoo empire. In 1564, she was installed as queen regent by Bayinnaung, in response to Mekuti's refusal to join Bayinnaung's military campaign against Ayutthaya, which was seen by Bayinnaung as an act of rebellion.

Throughout her fourteen-year reign, Lan Na enjoyed political stability, and Wisutthithewi offered tribute to the Toungoo empire, in exchange for political stability in her dominion, which had seen recurrent instability from raids and conflicts with neighboring territories.

Wisutthithewi is portrayed in a contemporaneous Thai epic poem Khlong mangthra rop Chiang Mai (โคลงมังทรารบเชียงใหม่), written by an anonymous Lan Na author. The poem mentions a queen, Mae Mintaya Sri, which implies that she may have been wed to Bayinnaung. However, no other Burmese or Lan Na sources corroborate any marriage between Bayinnaung and Wisutthithewi; moreover, no Chiang Mai princess is listed among Bayinnaung's queens and concubines in these sources.

Death 
Wisutthithewi died in October 1578, and news of her death reached Pegu in January 1579. Following her death, Bayinnaung appointed his son Nawrahta Minsaw as her successor. The ashes of Wisutthithewi are interred in a chedi at Wat Lok Moli in Chiang Mai.

See also 

 Toungoo dynasty
 Lan Na
 List of rulers of Lan Na

References 

Rulers of Chiang Mai
Toungoo dynasty
Queens regnant in Asia
16th-century women rulers